The 2020 Akron Zips football team represented the University of Akron during the 2020 NCAA Division I FBS football season. The Zips were led by second-year head coach Tom Arth and played their home games at InfoCision Stadium in Akron, Ohio. They competed as members of the East Division of the Mid-American Conference (MAC). In their fifth game, the Zips defeated Bowling Green, 31–3, to break their 21-game losing streak dating back to the 2018 season.

Schedule
Akron had non-conference games scheduled against Clemson, Youngstown State, New Mexico State, and UMass, which all were canceled due to the COVID-19 pandemic.

Coaching staff

 Tom Arth - Head coach
 Matt Feeney – Defensive Coordinator / Safeties
 Tommy Zagorski – Offensive coordinator / Offensive Line
 Bryan Gasser – Co-Offensive Coordinator / Wide Receivers
 Chris Hurd – Special Teams / Fullbacks / Halfbacks
 Oscar Rodriguez Jr. – Inside Linebackers
 Brian Cochran – Defensive Line
 Chris Cook – Tight ends
 Deonte Gibson – Outside Linebackers / Defensive Ends
 Jayden Everett – Running Backs
 Jamael Lett – Secondary

References

Akron
Akron Zips football seasons
Akron Zips football